The Dariganga (Mongolian: Дарьганга) are an eastern Mongol subgroup who mainly live in Dari Ovoo and Ganga Lake, Sukhbaatar Province.

It is believed that the Dariganga were resettled by the Qing Dynasty from Chahar, Khalkha and Ööled to herd horses of the Emperor in the late 1690s.

From 1912 on, a Ministry of Internal Affairs of the Boghda Khaanate of Mongolia supervised them. And the People's Republic of Mongolia changed their banner system in 1921. After many reforms in Mongolian administration structure, the Dariganga people have lived in the sums: Dariganga, Naran, Ongon, Khalzan, Asgat and Bayandelger of Sukhbaatar Province since 1691.

References

Mongols
Ethnic groups in Mongolia
Khalkha